Ilkin Muradov is an Azerbaijani professional footballer who plays as a midfielder for Zira in the Azerbaijan Premier League.

Club career
On 29 April 2017, Muradov made his debut in the Azerbaijan Premier League for Zira match against Shuvalan.

On 15 February 2023, Muradov joined Sabail on loan for the remainder of the season.

Career statistics

Club

References

External links
 

1998 births
Living people
Association football midfielders
Azerbaijani footballers
Azerbaijan youth international footballers
Azerbaijan under-21 international footballers
Azerbaijan Premier League players
Zira FK players